Gaute Haugenes is a Norwegian professional football manager who is best known for coaching  Fulham L.F.C..

Career

In 2002 Gaute Haugenes was hired as the coach for Fulham,in 2002 Haugenes won the FA Cup with Fulham. Gaute Haugenes resigned from Fulham at the end of the 2003 season when The Football Association decided against making the FA Women's National League players full time professionals. In 2009 Haugenes was hired by Amazon Grimstad.

Personal life

Gaute Haugenes is married to former footballer Margunn Haugenes .

Honours
Fulham
 FA Women's Premier League National Division: 2002–03
 FA Women's Cup: 2002 2003
 FA Women's Premier League Cup: 2002, 2003

References

Norwegian expatriate sportspeople in England
Norwegian football managers
Norwegian expatriate football managers
Expatriate football managers in England
Year of birth missing (living people)
Living people